This Is Darin is an album by Bobby Darin, released in 1960. It was on the Billboard charts for 50 weeks and peaked at number six. Richard Wess arranged and conducted the material for the album.

Reception

Music critic J.T. Griffith wrote in his Allmusic review, "This Is Darin showcases his confident phrasing with some moments of humor and a few trademark 'hut hut's (six in the first song!)... Gone is the bobby-sock rock of 'Splish Splash' and even the crossover appeal of 'Mack the Knife.' In its place is a more mature Bobby Darin aiming for adult—not pop—credibility... This Is Darin is highly recommended if you have long since tired of the Swingers soundtrack and want to discover Darin's more traditional fare."

Track listing

Side one
"Clementine" (Woody Harris) – 3:13
"Have You Got Any Castles, Baby?" (Johnny Mercer, Richard A. Whiting) – 3:33
"Don't Dream of Anybody But Me" (Neal Hefti, Bart Howard) – 4:08
"My Gal Sal" (Paul Dresser) – 2:06
"Black Coffee" (Sonny Burke, Paul Francis Webster) – 3:59
"Caravan" (Duke Ellington, Irving Mills, Juan Tizol) – 2:58

Side two
"Guys and Dolls" (Frank Loesser) – 2:10
"Down With Love" (E.Y. Harburg, Harold Arlen, Burton Lane) – 2:55
"Pete Kelly's Blues" (Sammy Cahn, Ray Heindorf) – 4:10
 All Nite Long" (Woody Harris) – 2:57
"The Gal That Got Away" (Harold Arlen, Ira Gershwin) – 4:03
"I Can't Give You Anything but Love" (Jimmy McHugh, Dorothy Fields) – 2:39

Personnel 
Bobby Darin – vocals
Richard Wess – arranger, conductor
Cover photo and design: Garrett/Howard
Supervision: Ahmet Ertegun & Nesuhi Ertegun

References 

Bobby Darin albums
1960 albums
Albums produced by Ahmet Ertegun
Albums produced by Nesuhi Ertegun
Atco Records albums